Horsham railway station is located on the Western standard gauge line in Victoria, Australia. It serves the city of Horsham, and it opened on 5 February 1879.

History

Horsham was officially opened on 5 February 1879 by the Governor of Victoria, George Bowen, along with the opening of the new railway line. The station celebrated its centenary on 5 February 1979.

In 1970, a number of track alterations took place at the station, including the removal of a carriage dock, a coal stage, and the siding leading to the former turntable. In 1971, the Urquart Street overpass, located at the Up end of the station, was provided, replacing two level crossings in the area. In 1972, another siding was abolished.

The former signal box was replaced with a signal panel in 1976, with the signal box demolished soon after. It was thought to be one of the oldest buildings in Horsham. In 1985, CTC signalling was provided at the station.

The station was served by V/Line Dimboola services, until the service was withdrawn on 21 August 1993.

In April 2007, the station was upgraded at a total cost of $490,000. However, only a small section of the platform was resurfaced, which has resulted in passengers having to move up or down the train to access the platform.

Platforms and services

Horsham has one platform. It is serviced by Journey Beyond The Overland services.

Platform 1:
  services to Adelaide Parklands and Melbourne Southern Cross

Transport Links

Horsham Transit operates two routes via Horsham station, under contract to Public Transport Victoria:
 : Natimuk Road – Shirley Street
 : to Roberts Avenue

V/Line operates road coach services via Horsham station.

References

External links
 Rail Geelong gallery
 Victorian Railway Stations gallery

Regional railway stations in Victoria (Australia)